Rui Santos may refer to:

 Rui Santos (archer) (born 1967), Portuguese archer
 Rui Santos (footballer) (born 1989), Portuguese footballer